The Brocken is the highest peak in northern Germany. It also may refer to:
Brocken station, the railway on the summit of the Brocken
Sender Brocken, a facility for FM and TV transmitters on Brocken Mountain
Brocken spectre, also called Brocken bow or mountain spectre, an atmospheric optical phenomenon
Brocken-Hochharz, a collective municipality in Saxony-Anhalt, Germany
Brocken, South Georgia, a mountain
Brocken, a poem book from Johann Peter Klassen
Brocken Jr., a character in the Kinnikuman wrestling anime series
Brocken (World Heroes), a character in the World Heroes fighting game series
Count Brocken, a villain from the fictional robot anime Mazinger Z
a colloquial word in German for rock or a big piece of something